is a Japanese writer. She has won the Gunzo Prize for New Writers, the Noma Literary New Face Prize and the Naoki Prize, and her work has been adapted for film.

Biography
Shimamoto was born in 1983 in Tokyo, Japan. She made her literary debut in 2001 with her story Shiruetto (Silhouette) while still a student at Tokyo Metropolitan Shinjuku Yamabuki Senior High School, winning the 44th Gunzo Prize for New Writers. Her 2002 novella Little by Little won the 25th Noma Literary New Face Prize and was nominated for an Akutagawa Prize, but did not win. Shimamoto was the youngest person to receive the Noma Literary New Face Prize in its history. 

In 2005 her novel Narratage was published and became a bestseller in Japan. A year later, Shimamoto dropped out of Rikkyo University to pursue her writing full-time. After being nominated for the Akutagawa Prize four times and the Naoki Prize twice, Shimamoto won the 159th Naoki Prize for her 2018 book First Love. The Naoki Prize committee members were not unanimous in their decision, but finally selected Shimamoto's work after multiple rounds of voting.

Shimamoto's novel Narratage was adapted by director Isao Yukisada into a 2017 film of the same name starring Kasumi Arimura and Jun Matsumoto. Her 2013 novel Yodaka no Kataomoi (lit. The Nighthawk's Unrequited Love), a story about a woman named Aiko, born with a large blue birthmark on her face, who navigates prejudice as she seeks love, was adapted by director Yūka Yasukawa into a 2022 film of the same name starring Rena Matsui as Aiko.

Shimamoto has cited Shuji Terayama as a literary influence.

Personal life
Shimamoto is married to Japanese novelist Yuya Sato.

Awards and honors
 2001 44th Gunzo Prize for New Writers 
 2003 25th Noma Literary New Face Prize
 2018 159th Naoki Prize (2018上)

Works 
 Shiruetto (Silhouette), Kodansha, 2001, 
 Ritoru bai ritoru (Little by Little), Kodansha, 2003, 
 Umareru mori, Kodansha, 2004, 
 Issen ichibyō no hibi, Magajin Hausu, 2005, 
 Naratāju (Narratage), Kadokawa Shoten, 2005, 
 Kurōbā, Kadokawa Shoten, 2007, 
 Anata no kokyū ga tomaru made, Shinchosha, 2007, 
 Namiuchigiwa no hotaru, Kadokawa Shoten, 2008, 
 Chica raifu (Chica Life), Kodansha, 2008,  
 Kimi ga furu hi, Gentosha, 2009, 
 Arare mo nai inori, Kawade Shobō Shinsha, 2010, 
 Mawatasō no jūnintachi, Bungeishunjū, 2010, 
 Andastuando meibī (Understand, Maybe), Chūō Kōron Shinsha, 2010, 
 Ōkina kuma ga kuru mae ni oyasumi, Shinchosha, 2010, 
 Nanao no tame ni, Kodansha, 2012, 
 Bīkyū ren'ai gurume no susume, Kadokawa Shoten, 2013, 
 Yodaka no kataomoi, Shueisha, 2013, 
 Shūmatsu wa kanojotachi no mono, Gentosha, 2013, 
 Reddo (Red), Chūō Kōron Shinsha, 2014, 
 Tokumeisha no tame no Supika, Shōdensha, 2015, 
 Inosento (Innocent), Shueisha, 2016, 
 Watashitachi wa gin no fōku to kusuri o te ni shite, Gentosha, 2017, 
 Natsu no saidan, Bungeishunjū, 2018, 
 Fāsuto rabu (First Love), Bungeishunjū, 2018,

References

1983 births
Living people
21st-century Japanese novelists
21st-century Japanese women writers
Naoki Prize winners
People from Tokyo